Vladimir Mikhailovich Malakhov (born 10 October 1955) is a Russian professional football coach and a former player.

External links
 

1955 births
Footballers from Baku
Living people
Soviet footballers
Azerbaijani footballers
Russian footballers
Russian Premier League players
FC Dynamo Stavropol players
FC Akhmat Grozny players
Association football goalkeepers
Russian football managers
FC Mashuk-KMV Pyatigorsk players